This is a list of soundtracks attributed to the drama CD and anime media types of the Japanese series Angel Sanctuary. Between 1999 and 2000 three CDs were released. The first was the soundtrack for the series of drama CDs, which cover the story of the Angel Sanctuary manga. The other two CDs were the soundtrack for the Angel Sanctuary OVA and the opening single for the OVA.

Angel Sanctuary Sound Track

The Angel Sanctuary Sound Track was the first album released for the Angel Sanctuary series. It covers the BGM of the series of drama CDs and was released on April 21, 1999.

Track listing

Angel Sanctuary OVA Original Sound Track

The Angel Sanctuary OVA Original Sound Track is the soundtrack to the OVA series of Angel Sanctuary and was first released on August 23, 2000.

Track listing

Knife of Romance

"Knife of Romance" is a split single by Phi and Yayoi Yula. It includes the opening and ending theme for the Angel Sanctuary OVA. It was first released on May 24, 2000.

Track listing

Discographies of Japanese artists
Anime soundtracks
1999 soundtrack albums
2000 soundtrack albums
Film and television discographies
Lists of soundtracks